Redmondville may refer to:

Redmondville, Missouri, an unincorporated community in Iron County
Redmondville, New Brunswick, an unincorporated community in Northumberland County